Newton-Conover High School (NCHS) is a public high school located in Newton, North Carolina, and is the one of two secondary schools in Newton-Conover City Schools system, alongside Discovery High School.

Athletics 
The school is a member of the North Carolina High School Athletic Association (NCHSAA) and competes in the 2A classification for high school athletics. 

Newton-Conover has won the following team NCHSAA state championships:

 2A Football – 2008
 2A Men's Golf – 2013, 2014, 2015
 2A Men's Soccer – 2007, 2014, 2017
 2A Men's Tennis – 2010, 2011
 2A Men's Track & Field – 2000
 2A Volleyball – 2011
 2A Women's Basketball – 1992, 2020
 1A/2A Women's Golf – 2021
 1A/2A Women's Tennis – 1986
 2A Wrestling State Dual Team – 2013, 2014, 2016

Notable people

Alumni
Dale Jarrett, NASCAR driver and 1999 Winston Cup Series champion
Chaz Beasley, North Carolina House of Representatives member
W. Stine Isenhower, North Carolina House of Representatives member
Robert Kearns, bass player for Lynyrd Skynyrd and Sheryl Crow
Brock Long, former director of FEMA
Andy Petree, vice president of Richard Childress Racing and NASCAR crew chief
Jerry Punch, auto racing and college football commentator
Dennis Setzer, NASCAR driver

Faculty
Andrea Stinson, former WNBA player and NC State Hall of Fame recipient

References

External links
Official site

Public high schools in North Carolina
Schools in Catawba County, North Carolina
Educational institutions in the United States with year of establishment missing